Rowan Crothers OAM (born 24 October 1997) is an Australian freestyle swimmer.  He represented Australia at the 2016 Rio Paralympics and the 2020 Tokyo Paralympics. He won two gold and one silver medals at the Tokyo Paralympics.

Personal life 
Crothers was born 15 weeks prematurely on 24 October 1997 in Gosford on the New South Wales Central Coast and currently lives in Moorooka, Queensland.

Rowan attended Newmarket State School, Kelvin Grove State College and St Laurence's College. He attempted to undertake tertiary studies at Griffith University however he decided he would prefer to not continue at university.

Crothers' prematurity resulted in him developing cerebral palsy due to IVH, and bronchopulmonary dysplasia causing permanent lung scarring. 
Rowan's Cerebral Palsy (spastic diplegia) impacts his coordination and motor control predominantly in his lower body, however his upper body is also affected to a lesser extent. Crothers requires a vehicle modified with hand controls to legally drive and is currently working towards obtaining a full licence. In the pool, CP impacts the effectiveness of his kick and ability to control body positioning. He has worked consistently on perfecting a propulsion style to make the most out of what coordination he has.

Rowan has been a member of the Yeronga Park Swim Club since 2012 where he initially trained under Rick Van Der Zant. He is currently trained by Kate Sparkes. Notable members of his training squad include or have included Ryan Pini, Lorna Tonks and Chelsea Gubecka.

Crothers features in the 2020 documentary No Distinguishing Features which .." follows the stories of six people living with disabilities from across Australia and New Zealand. Six people who were given a strict roadmap for their life the moment they were born. Six people who went on to tear that roadmap to shreds."

Career
Crothers made his international swimming debut as a 13-year-old at the 2011 Arafura Games where he claimed a bronze medal in the Men's 400 m MC freestyle and broke 4 Australian National Age Records in the 50m, 100 m, 200 m and 400 m freestyle events in the S9 classification. He went on to claim S9 Australian National Age Records in freestyle as a 13, 14, 15 and 16 year old in the 50 m, 100 m, 200 m, and the 400 m freestyle.

At the 2013 Australian Short Course Championships Rowan broke the men's S9 World Record for the 400 m SC freestyle.

In 2014 at the Australian Swimming Championships, Crothers broke World Records in the S9 100 m freestyle twice, and another in the S9 200 m freestyle. These swims qualified him for the 2014 Australian Commonwealth Games Swim Team and the 2014 Para Pan Pacs Team. Crothers went on to win Gold at the 2014 Commonwealth Games breaking his own World Record

In 2016 Crothers was reclassified from S9 to S10 which was a major adjustment. He went on to compete at the 2016 Rio Paralympics in four events and qualified for the finals in each. He placed fifth in the Men's 4 × 100 m Freestyle (34 points), sixth in Men's 400 m Freestyle S10, fifth in Men's 100 m Freestyle S10 and sixth in Men's 50 m Freestyle S10.

At the 2019 World Para Swimming Championships, he won the bronze medals in the Men's 50 m and 100 m Freestyle S10.

In 2021 Crothers swam at the delayed 2020 Tokyo Paralympic Games winning gold in the 50 m Freestyle S10 with a time of 23.21, and silver in the 100 m Freestyle S10 with a time of 51,37. Crothers won gold in the Men's 4×100 m freestyle 34 pts along with William Martin, Matt Levy and Ben Popham, breaking the current World Record by almost 2 seconds.

Crothers won two gold medals - Men's 50 m Freestyle  and Men's 100m Freestyle at the 2022 World Para Swimming Championships, Madeira.

Winning Performances

International Competition Medals

2011 Arafura Games inc. Oceanic Paralympic Championships

Bronze - Men's 400 LC Meter Freestyle Multi-Class 

2013 IPC Swimming World Championships - Montreal

Gold – Men's 34pt 4 × 100 m freestyle relay 

Bronze - S9 Male 100m freestyle 

2014 Commonwealth Games

Gold – S9 Male 100m freestyle (WR)  

2018 Pan Pacific Para Swimming Championships

Gold – Men's Open 400 LC Metre Freestyle Multi-Class

Gold – Men's Open 100 LC Metre Freestyle Multi-Class

Gold - Men 4x100 LC Metre Freestyle 34 point, S1 - S10 Relay

Silver – Men's Open 50 LC Metre Freestyle Multi-Class

2020 Tokyo Paralympic Games

Gold - Men's 50m Freestyle - S10

Silver - Men's 50m Freestyle - S10

Gold - Men 4x100 LC Metre Freestyle 34 point, S1 - S10 Relay (WR)

National Open Competition Medals
2012 Australian Open Swimming Championships

Silver - Men 12 & Over 400 LC Metre Freestyle Multi-Class 

2013 Australian Open Water Championships

Silver - Men 5K Open Water Multi-Class

2013 Australian Open Swimming Championships

Silver - Male 400 LC Metre Freestyle Multi-Class 

Bronze - Male 100 LC Metre Freestyle Multi-Class 

2013 Australian Open Short Course Swimming Championships

Gold – Men's Open 400 SC Metre Freestyle Multi-Class (WR)

2014 Australian Open Swimming Championships

Gold – Men's 100m freestyle Para Sport S9 (WR)

Gold – Men's Open 100 LC Metre Freestyle Multi-Class (WR)

Silver – Men's Open 400 LC Metre Freestyle Multi-Class

Gold – Men's Open 200 LC Metre Freestyle Multi-Class (WR)

2016 Australian Open Swimming Championships

Silver – Men's Open 400 LC Metre Freestyle Multi-Class

Silver - 4 × 50 m MC freestyle relay

2017 Australian Open Swimming Championships

Bronze - Men's Open 50 LC Metre Freestyle Multi-Class 

2019 Australian Open Swimming Championships

Gold - Men's Open 50 LC Metre Freestyle Multi-Class

Gold - Men's Open 100 LC Metre Freestyle Multi-Class

Awards

2009 Best Novice Athlete - Sporting Wheelies and Disabled Association 
2009/10 North-West Regional Finalist - Quest Youngstar Award for Sport 
2010 Most Improved Junior Athlete - Sporting Wheelies and Disabled Association
2010/11 North-West Regional Finalist - Quest Youngstar Award for Sport 
2010 Roy Fowler Male Swimmer of the Meet - Queensland AWD Swimming Championships 
2011 Best Junior Athlete - Sporting Wheelies and Disabled Association
2011 Swimmer of the Meet State Multi-Class Swimming Championships - Queensland Swimming 
2011/12 North-West Regional Winner - Quest Youngstar Award for Sport  
2012 Swimmer of the Meet State Multi-Class Swimming Championships - Queensland Swimming 
2013 RSL Youth Development Program Grant Recipient  
2013 Brisbane Swimming Association Swimmer with a Disability for 2012/13 
2014 Brisbane Swimming Association President's Award for 2013/14 (Glen Bigg Trophy) 
2014 Junior and Senior Male Athlete of the Year - Sporting Wheelies and Disabled Association 
2017 - Swimming Australia Paralympic Program Swimmer of the Year.

Recognition
 2022 – Medal of the Order of Australia
 2022 - Swimming Australia Paralympic Program Swimmer of the Year

References

External links
 
 
 
 
 

1997 births
Living people
Male Paralympic swimmers of Australia
Recipients of the Medal of the Order of Australia
Swimmers with cerebral palsy
World record holders in paralympic swimming
Australian male freestyle swimmers
Sportsmen from Queensland
Swimmers at the 2014 Commonwealth Games
Swimmers at the 2016 Summer Paralympics
Swimmers at the 2020 Summer Paralympics
Medalists at the 2020 Summer Paralympics
Paralympic gold medalists for Australia
Paralympic silver medalists for Australia
Paralympic medalists in swimming
Commonwealth Games gold medallists for Australia
Commonwealth Games medallists in swimming
Medalists at the World Para Swimming Championships
S10-classified Paralympic swimmers
Medallists at the 2014 Commonwealth Games